Cotton Edmunds is a former civil parish, now in the parish of Christleton, in Cheshire West and Chester, England.  It contains two buildings that are recorded in the National Heritage List for England as designated listed buildings, each of which is at Grade II.  This grade is the lowest of the three gradings given to listed buildings and is applied to "buildings of national importance and special interest".  The listed buildings consist of three packhorse bridges, two of which are designated together.

References

Listed buildings in Cheshire West and Chester
Lists of listed buildings in Cheshire